Lockes Landing is an unincorporated community on the Shenandoah River in Clarke County, Virginia.

Unincorporated communities in Clarke County, Virginia
Unincorporated communities in Virginia